Roma Creek is a former census-designated place (CDP) in Starr County, Texas, United States. The population was 350 at the 2010 census down from 610 at the 2000 census.

As of the 2020 U.S. Census the 2010 version of the CDP is now a part of Roma, Texas.

Geography
Roma Creek is located at  (26.419189, -99.018475).

Prior to the 2010 census, Roma Creek CDP had part annexed to Roma city, parts taken to form new CDPs, and lost additional area. As a result, the total area was reduced to 0.2 square miles (0.5 km2), all land.

Demographics
As of the census of 2000, there were 610 people, 141 households, and 133 families residing in the CDP. The population density was 117.5 people per square mile (45.4/km2). There were 161 housing units at an average density of 31.0/sq mi (12.0/km2). The racial makeup of the CDP was 97.54% White, 0.16% African American, 1.15% from other races, and 1.15% from two or more races. Hispanic or Latino of any race were 100.00% of the population.

There were 141 households, out of which 70.2% had children under the age of 18 living with them, 76.6% were married couples living together, 17.0% had a female householder with no husband present, and 5.0% were non-families. 4.3% of all households were made up of individuals, and 2.1% had someone living alone who was 65 years of age or older. The average household size was 4.24 and the average family size was 4.39.

In the CDP, the population was spread out, with 42.6% under the age of 18, 9.2% from 18 to 24, 32.1% from 25 to 44, 10.2% from 45 to 64, and 5.9% who were 65 years of age or older. The median age was 23 years. For every 100 females, there were 87.7 males. For every 100 females age 18 and over, there were 88.2 males.

The median income for a household in the CDP was $12,750, and the median income for a family was $12,270. Males had a median income of $11,250 versus $0 for females. The per capita income for the CDP was $5,062. About 63.2% of families and 66.7% of the population were below the poverty line, including 75.1% of those under age 18 and 61.5% of those age 65 or over.

Education
Public education in the community of Roma Creek is provided by the Roma Independent School District. The zoned elementary school for the 2010 Census community is Emma Vera Elementary School. Roma High School is the district's sole comprehensive high school.

Zoned campuses for the former Roma Creek, in 2009–2010, included Anna S. Canavan Elementary School (pre-kindergarten), Emma Vera Elementary School (grades K-5), Roma Middle School (grades 6–8), and Roma High School  (grades 9–12).

References

Census-designated places in Starr County, Texas
Census-designated places in Texas